The destructive or dark flour beetle (Tribolium destructor), one of the species of darkling beetle known generally as flour beetles, is a common pest insect known for attacking and infesting stored flour and grain.

It is a very dark brown beetle (darker than other Tribolium species) 5–6 mm long. T. destructor is found in North America, Europe and Africa. In addition to damaging flour and grain, it attacks animal food pellets, rolled oats, and poultry feed.

See also
Home stored product entomology

References

External links

Tribolium species are hard to identify. Here are four species side by side. Note that several species of Tribolium may occur in the same infestation.Colpolon

Tenebrionidae
Household pest insects
Storage pests
Beetles of North America
Beetles described in 1934